Merritt James Norvell Jr. (February 12, 1941 – October 19, 2020) was an American college athletics administrator. He served as the athletic director at Michigan State University from 1995 to 1998.

Norvell attended Jacksonville High School in Jacksonville, Illinois, were he starred in four sports. He moved on to the University of Wisconsin–Madison, where he played college football for the Wisconsin Badgers as a halfback and was a member of the 1962 Wisconsin Badgers football team that played in the 1963 Rose Bowl.

Norvell died on October 19, 2020, in Lansing, Michigan. Novell's son, Jay Norvell, is a football coach and former player.

References

1941 births
2020 deaths
American football halfbacks
Michigan State Spartans athletic directors
Wisconsin Badgers football players
Sportspeople from Jacksonville, Illinois
Players of American football from Illinois
African-American players of American football
African-American college athletic directors in the United States